Miriam Ashram High School is a Catholic secondary school founded by the Servant of God Br. Flavian Laplante, C.S.C. (Congregation of Holy Cross) in 1946 at Diang in Patiya Upazila, Chittagong District, Bangladesh.

References

External links
 https://www.facebook.com/pages/Mariam-Ashram-High-School/198831786829334

Holy Cross secondary schools
Catholic secondary schools in Bangladesh
Educational institutions established in 1946
1946 establishments in India
Schools in Chittagong District